Airport Road may refer to:

Asia
Airport Road in Chaklala, Rawalpindi, Pakistan
Airport Road, a section of Andrews Avenue in Metro Manila, Philippines
Airport Road, Dhaka, Bangladesh
Airport Road metro station, Mumbai, India
Baghdad Airport Road, Iraq
D 89 road (United Arab Emirates) in Dubai, UAE
Old Airport Road, Bangalore, India

North America
Airport Road, a section of Nevada State Route 525 in Carson City, Nevada, US
Airport Road, Wyoming, an unincorporated community in Washakie County, Wyoming, US
Airport Road (Huntsville), Alabama, US
Airport Road (Ontario), Canada
Nevada State Route 759, also known as Douglas County Airport Road
Nevada State Route 796, in Humboldt County, Nevada, US
Pennsylvania Route 987, formerly known as Airport Road, in Pennsylvania, US
Veterans Memorial Parkway, formerly known as Airport Road, in London, Ontario, Canada

See also
 Airport Boulevard (disambiguation)
 Airport Drive (disambiguation)